Mille Lacs National Wildlife Refuge is a 0.57 acre (2,300 m2) National Wildlife Refuge in central Minnesota.  The refuge consists solely of two small islands in Mille Lacs Lake, and is the smallest National Wildlife Refuge in the United States.  It was created on May 14, 1915 to preserve breeding habitat for several bird species.  The islands are one of only four breeding colonies of common terns, a threatened species in Minnesota.  Other native species breeding within the refuge include ring-billed and herring gulls and double-crested cormorants.

The islands can only be reached by boat.  Landing on them is officially discouraged (though not forbidden), and instead visitors are asked to conduct their birdwatching from watercraft.

Mille Lacs National Wildlife Refuge is administered from Rice Lake National Wildlife Refuge.

External links
 Mille Lacs National Wildlife Refuge

Lake islands of Minnesota
Protected areas of Mille Lacs County, Minnesota
National Wildlife Refuges in Minnesota
Protected areas established in 1915
Landforms of Mille Lacs County, Minnesota
1915 establishments in Minnesota